Alfonso Thiele (5 April 1920 – 15 July 1986) was a racing driver who held dual citizenship of the United States and Italy, though he spent most of his life in Italy. He participated in one Formula One World Championship Grand Prix, on 4 September 1960.  He scored no championship points.  Most of his career was spent in sports car racing.

World War II
During World War II Thiele was a captain of the Office of Strategic Services of Italian anti-fascist partisans.

Driving career
Working as a test driver for Abarth he participated in many events and races. In 1955 he was a member of the team that completed 3,743.642 km at an average speed of 155.985 km/h at the Monza track. One week later, with journalists present and participating, the team set the 500 km, 500-mile, 1,000 km, 48-hour and 72-hour records.

Personal life 

During World War II Thiele was a captain of the Office of Strategic Services of Italian anti-fascist partisans. There he met Walkiria Terradura, another partisan who was later awarded the Silver Medal of Military Valour. They married and briefly lived with in the United States after the war, before returning to Italy. She remained active in politics and in the veterans' organisation, the National Association of Italian Partisans.

Complete Formula One Grand Prix results
(key)

Sports car results
Source:

References

1920 births
1986 deaths
American racing drivers
American Formula One drivers
Scuderia Centro Sud Formula One drivers
Italian racing drivers
Italian Formula One drivers
Sportspeople from Istanbul
Italian emigrants to the United States
Italian expatriates in the Ottoman Empire